Southern Punjab cricket team is a domestic cricket team in Pakistan representing the southern parts of the Punjab province. It competes in domestic first-class, List A and T20 cricket competitions, namely the Quaid-e-Azam Trophy, Pakistan Cup and National T20 Cup. The team is operated by the Southern Punjab Cricket Association.

History
The team was introduced as a part of the new domestic structure announced by the Pakistan Cricket Board (PCB) on 31 August 2019. On 3 September 2019, the PCB confirmed the squad for the team. In December 2020, it was announced that Aaron Summers would play for Southern Punjab in the 2020–21 Pakistan Cup, becoming the first Australian cricketer to play in a domestic cricket competition in Pakistan.

2019/20 Season 
Southern Punjab finished in fourth and third place respectively in the Quaid-e-Azam Trophy and National T20 Cup. The Pakistan Cup was cancelled this season due to the covid-19 pandemic.

2020/21 Season 
The team finished in third, fourth and fifth place respectively, in the Quaid-e-Azam Trophy, Pakistan Cup and the National T20 Cup.

Structure

As of 2019, domestic cricket in Pakistan was reorganised into six regional teams (on provincial lines). A three tier bottom-up system is in operation with the Tier 1 teams participating in the Quaid-e-Azam Trophy (First Class), Pakistan Cup (List A) and National T20 Cup (Regional T20). The Tier 2 teams participate in the City Cricket Association Tournament whilst the Tier 3 teams participate in various local tournaments as both tiers feed players to the Tier 1 team. 
 Tier 1: Southern Punjab
 Tier 2: Sahiwal, Lodhran, Okara, Multan, Vehari, Khanewal, D.G. Khan, Bahawalnagar, R.Y. Khan, Layyah, Pakpattan, Muzaffargarh, Bahawalpur & Layyah.
 Tier 3: Various clubs and schools.

Current squad
Players with international caps are listed in bold.

See also
 Balochistan cricket team
 Central Punjab cricket team
 Khyber Pakhtunkhwa cricket team
 Northern cricket team
 Sindh cricket team

References

Pakistani first-class cricket teams
Southern Punjab (Pakistan)
Cricket clubs established in 2019
Sports clubs in Pakistan
2019 establishments in Pakistan